Jackson County is a county located in the U.S. state of Iowa. As of the 2020 census, the population was 19,485. The county seat is Maquoketa.

History
The county was formed on December 21, 1837, and named after US President Andrew Jackson.

In the early morning of July 22, 2022, an assailant killed three members of a family at the campground of Maquoketa Caves State Park, located in the county. The assailant, identified as 23-year-old Anthony Sherwin of Nebraska, later committed suicide.

Geography
Its eastern border is formed by the Mississippi River.

Major highways
 U.S. Highway 52
 U.S. Highway 61
 U.S. Highway 67
 Iowa Highway 62
 Iowa Highway 64

Adjacent counties
Dubuque County (north)
Jo Daviess County, Illinois (northeast)
Carroll County, Illinois (east)
Clinton County (south)
Jones County (west)

National protected areas
 Driftless Area National Wildlife Refuge (part)
 Upper Mississippi River National Wildlife and Fish Refuge (part)

State protected areas
Maquoketa Caves State Park
Bellevue State Park

Demographics

2020 census
There were 9,241 housing units, of which 8,305 were occupied.

2010 census
There were 9,415 housing units, of which 8,289 were occupied.

2000 census

As of the census of 2000, there were 20,296 people, 8,078 households, and 5,589 families residing in the county. The population density was 32 people per square mile (12/km2). There were 8,949 housing units at an average density of 14 per square mile (5/km2). The racial makeup of the county was 98.96% White, 0.10% Black or African American, 0.12% Native American, 0.09% Asian, 0.11% Pacific Islander, 0.15% from other races, and 0.47% from two or more races. 0.60% of the population were Hispanic or Latino of any race.

There were 8,078 households, out of which 32.00% had children under the age of 18 living with them, 58.20% were married couples living together, 7.70% had a female householder with no husband present, and 30.80% were non-families. 27.00% of all households were made up of individuals, and 13.80% had someone living alone who was 65 years of age or older. The average household size was 2.47 and the average family size was 3.01.

In the county, the population was spread out, with 26.00% under the age of 18, 7.00% from 18 to 24, 26.50% from 25 to 44, 23.20% from 45 to 64, and 17.30% who were 65 years of age or older. The median age was 39 years. For every 100 females there were 97.10 males. For every 100 females age 18 and over, there were 93.90 males.

The median income for a household in the county was $34,529, and the median income for a family was $42,526. Males had a median income of $29,334 versus $20,577 for females. The per capita income for the county was $17,329. About 7.70% of families and 10.30% of the population were below the poverty line, including 13.90% of those under age 18 and 8.90% of those age 65 or over.

Government
 
 the three-member Jackson County Board of Supervisors is Larry McDevitt, Mike Steines, and Jack Willey.  Their Executive Assistant is LuAnn Goeke.

Sheriff's office

The Jackson County Sheriff's Office is the primary law enforcement agency located in the county.  The headquarters for the Sheriff's Department are in Maquoketa, Iowa.  The department is led by an elected Sheriff.  The  Sheriff is Brent Kilburg.

Fire Protection and Emergency Medical Services
Fire protection in the county is left up to the discretion of the cities within the county. The towns of Maquoketa, Preston, Miles, Springbrook, Sabula, Baldwin, Bellevue, Andrew and La Motte all have their own fire departments providing protection for the whole county. Most city fire departments also provide rescue services. Fire equipment usually consists of Engines, Tankers and brush trucks as well as most fire departments owning a Rescue truck. The Maquoketa Fire department also owns a Ladder truck. Most firefighters certify as Iowa Firefighter One and HAZMAT Operations and some also are certified as EMTs. The towns of Maquoketa, Preston, Sabula and Bellevue also have their own Ambulance Services which provide coverage for the county while towns not having ambulances have First Responder units and contract ambulance response to a nearby community. All firefighters in Jackson County are volunteers and most EMS personnel are also volunteers however the Maquoketa Ambulance Service is a paid service. All Jackson County departments are members of the Jackson County Firefighters Association and the Iowa Firefighters Association. Mutual Aid Agreements from surrounding Iowa counties as well as the state of Illinois are in place to provide additional help during emergencies which tax the county emergency resources beyond their limits.

Townships
Jackson County is divided into 18 townships, administrative subdivisions of the county:

 Bellevue
 Brandon
 Butler
 Fairfield
 Farmers Creek
 Iowa
 Jackson
 Maquoketa
 Monmouth
 Otter Creek
 Perry
 Prairie Springs
 Richland
 South Fork
 Tete Des Morts
 Union
 Van Buren
 Washington

Hospital
Jackson County has one Hospital in Maquoketa, the Jackson County Regional Health Center.  the hospital is under the administration of Genesis Healthcare. Patients near Maquoketa are transported to this hospital, while patients closer to Clinton County will most likely be taken to Mercy Medical Center in Clinton, Iowa. Some patients closer to Dubuque County are taken to Mercy or Finley Hospitals, both in the city of Dubuque.

Election results
Prior to 1988, Jackson County was a Republican-leaning swing county, only failing to back the national winner six times between 1880 & 1984. The county was reliably Democratic from 1988 to 2012, but swung by 18% to back Donald Trump in 2016. In 2020 Donald Trump carried Jackson County with 62% of the vote over Joseph Biden 36%.

Communities

Incorporated communities

Unincorporated communities
 Canton‡
 Cottonville
 Emeline
 Garryowen
 Green Island
 Nashville
 Otter Creek
 South Garry Owen

Former communities 

Alma
Amoy
America
Bridgeport
Brookfield
Buckhorn
Canton
Carrollport
Centerville
Charleston
Charkstown
Cobb
Coloma
Copper Creek
Cottonville
Crabb
Crabb's Mill
Crabbtown
Deventersville
Duggan
Duke
Fremont
Fulton
Gordon's Ferry
Hickory Grove
Higginsport
Hugo
Hurstville
Fairfield
Farmers Creek
Franklin
Iron Hill
East Iron Hills
Isabel
Lowell
Millrock
Mount Algor
Nashville
New Castle
New Rochester
North Maquoketa
Otter Creek
Ozark
Pass
Prairie Springs
Rolley
Silsbee
Smiths Ferry
Springfield
Spruce Mills
Sterling
Sullivan
Summer Hill
Sylva
Tetes des Morts
Union Center
Van Buren
Wagonersburgh
Waterford
Wickliffe

See also

National Register of Historic Places listings in Jackson County, Iowa

Bibliography
 Sorensen, Lucille. Holihan, Grace. Ghost Towns of Jackson County Iowa/History of Jackson County, Vol. 1, Jackson County Historical Society 1988 and 2000.

References

External links

Official Jackson County Government Website
Jackson County Economic Development Council's website
Jackson County Government Overview Webpages
Jackson County Historical Society

 
1837 establishments in Wisconsin Territory
Populated places established in 1837
Iowa counties on the Mississippi River